St Johns Hill is a suburb of Whanganui, in the Whanganui District and Manawatū-Whanganui region of New Zealand's North Island.

Demographics

It had a population of 3,375 at the 2018 New Zealand census, an increase of 231 people (7.3%) since the 2013 census, and an increase of 279 people (9.0%) since the 2006 census. There were 1,386 households. There were 1,497 males and 1,878 females, giving a sex ratio of 0.8 males per female, with 525 people (15.6%) aged under 15 years, 405 (12.0%) aged 15 to 29, 1,371 (40.6%) aged 30 to 64, and 1,074 (31.8%) aged 65 or older.

Ethnicities were 88.4% European/Pākehā, 10.0% Māori, 1.5% Pacific peoples, 5.2% Asian, and 2.3% other ethnicities (totals add to more than 100% since people could identify with multiple ethnicities).

The proportion of people born overseas was 18.6%, compared with 27.1% nationally.

Although some people objected to giving their religion, 40.5% had no religion, 48.8% were Christian, 0.7% were Hindu, 0.1% were Muslim, 0.5% were Buddhist and 2.2% had other religions.

Of those at least 15 years old, 630 (22.1%) people had a bachelor or higher degree, and 528 (18.5%) people had no formal qualifications. The employment status of those at least 15 was that 1,137 (39.9%) people were employed full-time, 393 (13.8%) were part-time, and 87 (3.1%) were unemployed.

Education

Parks 
Rotokawau Virginia Lake, located on St John's Hill, is a historic lake with a fountain, Art Deco conservatory and winter garden.

Notable people 

 James K. Baxter, poet and playwright, attended St Johns Hill School in 1936
 Emily White started a garden on her large property on St Johns Hill in 1882; it gained international renown

References 

Suburbs of Whanganui